Tamara Reeves (born 17 April 1982) is a South African former cricketer who played as a wicket-keeper and right-handed batter. She appeared in four One Day Internationals for South Africa between 2002 and 2005. She played domestic cricket for Gauteng, as well as appearing in one tour match for Northerns.

References

External links
 
 

1982 births
Living people
People from Edenvale, Gauteng
South African women cricketers
South Africa women One Day International cricketers
Central Gauteng women cricketers
Northerns women cricketers
Wicket-keepers